Global sustainability statistics are benchmarks for measuring the status of sustainability parameters. The following agencies provide baseline data for sustainability governance. They are just one form of data used for sustainability accounting and are valuable for assessing trends and measuring progress.

This list provides sources of statistics at the global level of governance only.

 General lists
 Meadows, D.H., Randers, J. & Meadows, D.L. 2004. Limits to growth: the 30-year update. Chelsea Green Publishing Company, White River Junction, USA.
 The CIAs World Fact Book
 World Data Center
 United Nations Environmental Indicators Also publications on environmental statistics and statistical methods.
 Water (water resources, water supply industry, waste water)
 Air pollution (SO2 & NOx), 
 Climate change (greenhouse gas emissions; by sector(absolute & percentage); CO2 emissions; CH4 & N2O emissions)
 Waste (municipal waste collection, treatment, hazardous waste)
 Land use (total land area by country, forest area by country, agricultural area by country).
 European Commission (Eurostat)
 Biodiversity
 Groombridge, B & Jenkins, M.D. 2002. World Atlas of Biodiversity. UNEP World Conservation Monitoring Centre
 Energy
 BP Statistical Review of World Energy
 The International Energy Agency. Key World Energy Statistics
 UN Energy Statistics Database
 Fisheries
 UN Food and Agriculture Organization
 Forests
 UN Food and Agriculture Organization
 Fertilizer
 International Fertilizer Industry Association
 Food and agriculture
 UN Food and Agriculture Organization. FAOSTAT
 Population
 United Nations Population Division
 United Nations Database 
 Population Reference Bureau
 American Association for Advancement of Science
 Water
 International Water Management Institute
 Stockholm International Water Institute
 United Nations Environmental Program
 Global Runoff Data Centre

See also 

 Sustainability accounting
 Sustainability science
 Sustainability governance
 Sustainability 
 Sustainable development

References

Statistics, global
Statistics, global
Statistics-related lists
Sustainability statistics